Lowndes Academy is an independent school in Lowndesboro, Alabama.

History
Lowndes Academy was founded in 1966 as a segregation academy. The school was established by white parents who were boycotting racially integrated public schools in Hayneville. In a 1968 interview, headmaster S. M. Champion said that he "didn't know" if the school would admit a qualified black student.

In the school's early days, the school relied on revenue from football games to fund school operations.

Accreditation
Lowndes Academy is accredited by the Alabama Independent School Association.

Demographics
Of 241 non-prekindergarten students enrolled in the 2009–2010 school year, 239 were white and 2 were black.  The 2010 demographic profile of Lowndes County, where the school is located, showed the population as 25.5% white and 73.8% black.

References

External links
 Lowndes Academy
Educational institutions established in 1966
Segregation academies in Alabama
Private high schools in Alabama
1966 establishments in Alabama